William Davies (sometimes credited William Davis or Will Davies) is an English producer and screenwriter. He has written and co-written a number of films including Twins (1988), The Real McCoy (1993), the Johnny English franchise (2003-2018), Alien Autopsy (2006), Flushed Away (2006), How to Train Your Dragon (2010), Puss in Boots (2011), and Lyle, Lyle, Crocodile (2022).

The British-born Davies is a graduate of Mercersburg Academy and Cambridge University. He is the brother of television producer Michael Davies and the opera singer Rebecca de Pont Davies.

Filmography

Film

Television

References

External links

Alumni of the University of Cambridge
Annie Award winners
English screenwriters
English male screenwriters
English film producers
Living people
Year of birth missing (living people)